Mountain Ash Cardiff Road railway station served the town of Mountain Ash, Rhondda Cynon Taf, Wales, from 1864 to 1964 on the Vale of Neath Railway.

History 
The station was opened as Mountain Ash on 5 October 1864 by the Taff Vale Railway. Its name was changed to Mountain Ash Cardiff Road on 1 July 1924. It closed on 15 June 1964.

References 

Disused railway stations in Rhondda Cynon Taf
Beeching closures in Wales
Railway stations in Great Britain opened in 1864
Railway stations in Great Britain closed in 1964
1864 establishments in Wales
1964 disestablishments in Wales
Former Taff Vale Railway stations